Goran Vlaović (born 7 August 1972) is a Croatian retired footballer who played as a striker.

Club career
Born in Nova Gradiška, Vlaović started his professional career with Osijek in 1989 and moved to HAŠK Građanski in 1992, before going abroad to play for Calcio Padova in Italy, Valencia in Spain and Panathinaikos in Greece, where he retired in June 2004. His biggest personal success at club level came when he topped the goalscoring charts of the 1993–94 Croatian First Football League, netting 29 goals for Dinamo Zagreb that season. The record remained unbroken for 13 years before Eduardo da Silva scored 34 goals for the same club in 2006–07. He remains the youngest player to have scored the most goals in a single season in Croatia. He also won the Copa del Rey and Supercopa de España with Valencia in 1999, as well as a Greek double with Panathinaikos in 2004.

International career
Vlaović was a member of the Croatia national team for over ten years, between July 1992 and August 2002. He won a total of 52 international caps and scored 15 goals for the team (plus a single goal in his only appearance for Croatia B in a friendly against Romania in 2001).

Vlaović made his international debut for Croatia on 5 July 1992 in their friendly match against Australia in Melbourne, during the team's three-match tour through Australia. After the tour, Vlaović only made four international appearances in just over three and a half years, and having undergone surgery to remove a blood clot from his brain in 1995, he was only able to make one appearance in the UEFA Euro 1996 qualifying. However, he started to play regularly for Croatia in early 1996. On 13 March 1996, he scored his first goals for the team in a friendly match against Korea Republic, netting a flawless hat-trick in Croatia's 3–0 victory.

He was subsequently added to the Croatian squad for the UEFA Euro 1996 finals in England, appearing in all of the team's four matches before they were knocked out by eventual champions, Germany, in the quarter-finals. In Croatia's first match at the tournament, against Turkey, he came off the bench to replace Alen Bokšić in the final 20 minutes and scored the only goal of the match in the 86th minute, thus becoming the first goalscorer for Croatia in a major international tournament.

Two years later, Vlaović was a member of the Croatian squad that won the bronze medal at the 1998 FIFA World Cup finals in France, their first FIFA World Cup appearance. He appeared in all of Croatia's seven matches at the tournament, although only making one appearance over the entire 90 minutes in the semi-finals against France. In the 80th minute of the quarter-finals against highly favoured Germany, he scored the second goal in Croatia's 3–0 victory, which all but secured the team's place in the semi-finals.

After a year and a half of absence from the national team, Vlaović made his international comeback in January 2001, making an appearance for Croatia B in a friendly match against Romania, also scoring one goal in the match. He went on to make four appearances and score one goal in Croatia's qualifying campaign for the 2002 FIFA World Cup. He was also added to Croatia's 23-man squad for the finals of that tournament, but was left an unused substitute in all three group matches as the team failed to qualify for the knock-out stages. He won his last international cap in a friendly match against Wales on 21 August 2002.

Career statistics

Club

International

Scores and results list Croatia's goal tally first, score column indicates score after each Vlaović goal.

Honours
Dinamo Zagreb
Croatian First League: 1992–93
Croatian Football Cup: 1994

Valencia
UEFA Intertoto Cup: 1998
Copa del Rey: 1999
Supercopa de España: 1999

Panathinaikos
Superleague Greece: 2003–04
Greek Football Cup: 2004

Croatia
FIFA World Cup: third place 1998
1996 International Cup Tournament

Individual
SN Yellow Shirt Award: 1993
Croatian First League top scorer: 1993, 1994
Croatian Cup top scorer: 1993
Franjo Bučar State Award for Sport: 1998

Orders
 Order of Danica Hrvatska with face of Franjo Bučar - 1995
 Order of the Croatian Trefoil - 1998

References

External links
 

1972 births
Living people
People from Nova Gradiška
Sport in Brod-Posavina County
Association football forwards
Yugoslav footballers
Croatian footballers
Croatia under-21 international footballers
Croatia international footballers
Croatia B international footballers
UEFA Euro 1996 players
1998 FIFA World Cup players
2002 FIFA World Cup players
NK Osijek players
GNK Dinamo Zagreb players
Calcio Padova players
Valencia CF players
Panathinaikos F.C. players
Yugoslav First League players
Croatian Football League players
Serie A players
La Liga players
Super League Greece players
Croatian expatriate footballers
Expatriate footballers in Italy
Croatian expatriate sportspeople in Italy
Expatriate footballers in Spain
Croatian expatriate sportspeople in Spain
Expatriate footballers in Greece
Croatian expatriate sportspeople in Greece